Berenguier is a given name and surname. Notable people with the name include:
Berenguier de Palazol (fl. 1160–1209), Catalan troubadour 
Berenguier de Poizrengier (fl. after 1195), French troubadour and poet
Rostaing Berenguier, 14th-century French troubadour and poet